The 2007 Thailand League Division 2 (Division 2 Football League 2007) had 12 teams. The top two teams were promoted to Thailand Division 1 League, and the bottom two teams were relegated.

Member clubs 

Army Welfare Department
Bangkok Christian College  
Chiang Mai (Relegation from 2006 Pro League 1 16th)
Kasetsart University (Relegation from 2006 Thailand Division 1 League)
Mueang Thong NongJork United  
Navy Fleet Support
Prachinburi joined the newly expanded league setup.
PTT
Samut Prakan
Satun  (Relegation from 2006 Pro League 1 15th)
Thai Christian Sports Club
Rajadamnern Thonburi College

Locations of Thailand Division 2 League 2007

Final league table

Champions

See also
 2007 Thailand Premier League
 2007 Thailand League Division 1

References

Thailand 2007 RSSSF

External links
 Official website
 Football Association of Thailand

2007 in Thai football leagues
2007